Chambo Ridge is a ridge in Washington County in the U.S. state of Missouri.

Chambo Ridge has the name of a businessman in the local charcoal industry.

References

Landforms of Washington County, Missouri
Ridges of Missouri